Charles Dyer (1794 in Bristol – 29 January 1848) was an architect based in London who designed many buildings in and around Bristol.

Some buildings of Charles Dyer

 St Pauls' Church, Bedminster (1829–1831)
 Engineers House, Bristol 1831
 The Lodge, Lyegrove House, Old Sodbury (1835)
 The Bishops' College and Chapel, Bristol (1835–1839)
 Dyers' Hall, London (1839–1840)
 The Victoria Rooms, Bristol (1839–1841)
 Christ Church, Clifton Down, Bristol (1841)

References

 H.M. Colvin, A Biographical Dictionary of British Architects, 1600-1840 (1997) 

1794 births
1848 deaths
Architects from London